Agustín Cano Lotero (born 8 June 2001) is a Colombian professional footballer who plays as a midfielder for Categoría Primera A club Atlético Nacional.

Career
Born in Medellín, Augustín Cano began his career at Atlético Nacional, where he joined the youth setup at the age of 12. Cano was promoted to first team for the 2020 Categoría Primera A season. On 6 October 2020, Cano committed himself to the Atlético Nacional, signing a contract until 2023. Cano made his debut for the club on 29 November 2020, against América de Cali.

Career statistics
.

References

2001 births
Living people
Footballers from Medellín
Colombian footballers
Colombia youth international footballers
Association football midfielders
Categoría Primera A players
Atlético Nacional footballers